North Warwickshire is a local government district with borough status in the ceremonial county of Warwickshire, West Midlands, England. Outlying settlements in the borough include the two towns of Atherstone (where the council is based) and Coleshill. Notable villages in the borough include Dordon, Polesworth, Kingsbury, Water Orton and Shustoke.

The North Warwickshire district was created on 1 April 1974 by a merger of the Atherstone Rural District and parts of the Meriden Rural District (the rest of which was merged into the West Midlands county).

North Warwickshire is a mostly rural area with several small market towns and a number of former mining villages. The area historically had a large coal mining industry, but this has now all died out. The last coal mine in the area, Daw Mill at Arley, closed in 2013. The district is relatively remote from the rest of Warwickshire, as the county is almost split in two by the West Midlands Boroughs of Solihull and Coventry.

The borough borders the neighboring Warwickshire district of Nuneaton and Bedworth to the south-south-east, Staffordshire to the west and northwest, Leicestershire to the north and northeast, the cities of Birmingham and Coventry to the southwest and southeast.

The borough's landscape is primarily of the mildly undulating agricultural variety, with the North Warwickshire plateau rising to 177 m (581 ft) above sea-level at Bentley Common, 2.5 miles southwest of Atherstone. The most significant bodies of water within North Warwickshire are Kingsbury Water Park, Shustoke Reservoir, the River Blythe and the mid-section of the Coventry Canal.

The boundaries of North Warwickshire are similar to those of the North Warwickshire parliamentary constituency.  However the constituency also includes the town of Bedworth, but does not include the villages of Hartshill and Arley. The local MP is Craig Tracey.

In 2007 the Conservatives took overall control of the Borough Council for the first time since the creation of the council within its current boundaries. The Council was retaken by Labour in 2011, then returned to Conservative control in 2015.

Parishes and settlements
Settlements in North Warwickshire include:
Ansley, Arley (Old Arley & New Arley), Astley, Atherstone, Austrey
Baddesley Ensor, Baxterley, Bentley, Birchley Heath, Birchmoor, Blythe End
Caldecote, Coleshill, Curdworth, Corley (Corley Ash & Corley Moor North). 
Dordon, Duke End
Fillongley, Freasley, Furnace End
Gilson, Great Packington, Grendon (Grendon Common, New Grendon, Old Grendon)
Hartshill, Heath Whitacre, Hurley, Hurley Common
Kingsbury
Lea Marston, Little Packington
Mancetter, Maxstoke, Merevale, Middleton, Moxhull
Nether Whitacre, Newton Regis,  No Man's Heath
Over Whitacre
Polesworth, Piccadilly
Ridge Lane Village
Seckington, Shustoke, Shuttington,
Warton, Water Orton, Whitacre Heath, Whittington, Wiggins Hill, Wishaw, Wood End (near Kingsbury), Wood End (near Fillongley)

For a list of wards in North Warwickshire by population see here

Local election results 1973-2020

, the party composition was as follows:

Historically, local election results have fallen like this:

Parties
The Borough is a very marginal seat between the Conservatives and Labour. Within the Borough, Polesworth East, Dordon, and Wood End are considered Labour safe seats, and Fillongley, Water Orton, Newton Regis and Curdworth are considered safe Conservative seats.

See also
 Hurley and Wood End

References 

 
Non-metropolitan districts of Warwickshire
Boroughs in England